Amany Burhanuddin Umar Lubis (born December 22, 1963) is an Indonesian Muslim, female scholar of Mandailing-Egyptian descent. As an Islamic scholar, Amany was appointed as chairperson of the Indonesian Ulema Council for Women, Youth and Families for the 2015–2020 period. On January 7, 2019, she was appointed as rector of the Syarif Hidayatullah State Islamic University Jakarta by the minister of religion affairs of the Republic of Indonesia, Lukman Hakim Saifuddin. Her new position made her as the first woman who served as chancellor of the largest Islamic university in Indonesia, Syarif Hidayatullah State Islamic University Jakarta.

Biography

Early life

Amany Lubis was born as the first child of four siblings. Her father was a man from Medan with Mandailing Batak blood named Burhanuddin Umar Lubis, while her mother was an Egyptian woman named Nabilah ‘Abdel Fattah. After marrying her father, her mother then added the name "Lubis" behind her name to be Nabilah Lubis.

Amany was born and grew up from an academic family environment. Her father, Burhanuddin, was a graduate of University of Baghdad in the 1960s. Whereas her mother, Nabilah, was a graduate of University of Cairo majoring in Library and Achievement, Nabilah then continued her master and doctoral studies at the Syarif Hidayatullah State Islamic Institute in Jakarta (IAIN Jakarta, Syarif Hidayatullah State Islamic University Jakarta in present day) in the field of Islamic studies (postgraduate program) and philology (doctoral program). Nabilah was the first female doctorate at IAIN Jakarta in 1992. After becoming a doctor, two years later Prof. Quraish Shihab, as chancellor of IAIN Jakarta, then appointed her as Dean of the Faculty of Adab and Humanities.

Amany Lubis is the elder sister of Sri Ilham Lubis, Lc., MPd. (a bureaucrat at the Ministry of Religion Affairs of the Republic of Indonesia), Umar Lubis (Indonesian actor and businessman), and Ustaz Ahmad Shabri Lubis (General Chairman of the Islamic Defenders Front Central Board).

References

Bibliography

Further reading

External links

 
 Profile at Tirto.id

Indonesian people of Egyptian descent
Mandailing people
Indonesian Muslims
Academics from Cairo
Al-Azhar University alumni
Syarif Hidayatullah State Islamic University Jakarta alumni
1963 births
Living people